Glines is a surname. Notable people with the surname include:

Abbi Glines (born 1977), American novelist
Edward Glines (1849–1917), American politician
John Glines (1933–2018), American playwright and theater producer
Shane Glines, American illustrator, animator, and character designer

See also
The Glines
IRCd#G-line